Rabbi Yaakov Peretz (sometimes spelled, Ya'aqob or Ya'aqobh) (Hebrew: יעקב פרץ, Arabic: يعقوب بيرتس) (born 1936) is a respected Posek and Rosh Yeshiva in Israel.

Biography 
Yaakov Peretz was born in the Mellah of Marrakesh, Morocco to a family of distinguished Rabbis, such as his father, Hakham Yossef Peretz. As a child, he attended Alliance Israélite Universelle schools, until he decided that he wished to study with the great Hakhamim of Morocco. He was tutored by and formed a close relationship with many notable figures, including the Chief Rabbi of Morocco at the time, Hakham Shaʼul Ibn Danan

When he was fifteen years old, in 1951, he was motivated to make Aliyah as part of the Youth Aliyah. He was taken to France and then travelled by boat to Israel, and was overcome with emotion when he saw the Holy Land for the first time.

He studied for 20 years at the Ponevezh Yeshiva in Bnei Brak, and is considered one of their most prominent alumni. He was ordained directly under the tutelage of Ponevezh Rosh Yeshiva, Rabbi Kahanemen, who decided to teach him specifically in Hebrew, as he did not speak Yiddish. He was also taught by Rabbi Baruch Dov Povarski.

Rabbinic career 
He currently serves as the Chief Rabbi of the Neve Yaakov district of Jerusalem, as well as a spiritual leader in Hebron. Additionally, he is the Rosh Yeshiva of the Shehebar Sephardic Center and the Rosh Kollel of Kollel Hekhal Pinhas in Geula/Meah Shearim, Israel. He also oversees the Shiviti Bet Din

He has written many books on Halakha and Jewish Ethics, and ordained hundreds of leading Rabbis as well as many active Chief Rabbis around the globe.

He travels to Jewish communities around the world, such as Argentina, Uzbekistan, and many other far-flung communities, that send him in to supervise matters of Jewish Law.

Beliefs  

Rabbi Peretz is very against Halakhic rulings that are overly stringent, and insists on the importance of all Jews following the law as stated by Maran Bet Yossef to the letter. He rejects religious Anti-Zionism, maintains the importance of physical exercise and secular studies (English, Math, Science, etc.) and insists on the value of not just focusing study on Talmud, but also on Miqra, Hebrew Grammar, and more.  He also adamantly defends learning the Peshat as the ideal method (for learning Miqra, Talmud, etc.) as opposed to analytical or Pilpul oriented schools of thought. He views all of these positions as the way things were always done by the Jews of the Middle East and the way he was raised and taught in Morocco.

References 

Sephardic Haredi rabbis in Israel
Mizrahi Jews
Rosh yeshivas
20th-century rabbis in Jerusalem
21st-century rabbis in Jerusalem
Authors of books on Jewish law
21st-century Moroccan rabbis
20th-century Moroccan Jews